The New Year's Eve of Old Lee is a 2016 Chinese comedy film directed and produced by Gao Qushu and starring Zhao Benshan, Yan Ni, Rayza, and Aaron Yan. It is based on the Taiwanese drama All Night on New Year's Eve by Li Zongxi. The film picks up the story of a family of three generations has been reunited with students for the new year. The film premiered in China on February 1, 2016.

Cast
 Zhao Benshan as Old Li, an empty nester who suffers Alzheimer's disease.
 Yan Ni as Li Yangduo, Old Li's daughter.
 Rayza as Julie, the daughter of Li Yangduo and the granddaughter of Old Li.
 Aaron Yan as Aaron, a university student, Julie's boyfriend.
 Pan Binlong 
 Da Peng
 Yu Hewei as a policeman
 Lian Yiming as Zhu Heping
 Liang Jing
 Qi Xi
 Huang Xiaolei as Sun Wukong
 Zhou Dongyu
 Wen Zhang
 Zhang Yi
 Mai Hongmei
 Chen Xiaoqing
 Cecilia Boey
 Zhang Xinyi
 Yuan Hong
 Chen He
 Xiaoshenyang
  Wang Xiaoli
 Song Xiaobao
 Jing Gangshan
 Vieven Liu
 Guan Hu
 Zhang Yibai
 Zhu Hongjia
 Zhang Li
 Binzi
 Sha Yi
 Ma Jingwu
 Ma Dehua
 Zhang Yuxi
 Gao Qunshu
 Guan Zongxiang
 Hu Ming
 Li Yu
 Chen Yuanyuan
 Yu Yue
 Bai Hongbiao
 Zhou Chuchu
 Tang Jingmei
 Cao Weiyu
 Han Qing
 Liu Tianzuo
 Cui Zige
 Cheng Fangxu
 Tong Yao
 Mai Hongmei
 Chen Xiaoqing
 Yu Feihong
 Song Yanfei
 Yao Chen
 Liu Xiaoguang

Soundtrack

Production
The film was shot entirely on location in suburban Beijing.

Release
The New Year's Eve of Old Lee was released on February 1, 2016 in China.

References

External links
 
 
 

2016 films
Chinese comedy films
Films shot in Beijing
Films set in Beijing
2016 comedy films
2010s Mandarin-language films